Algallarín is a village in Córdoba, Andalusia, Spain. It is part of the municipality of Adamuz.

History
It was designed as a model village by the modernist architect Carlos Arniches. The project was developed in the 1950s under the auspices of the Instituto Nacional de Colonización.

Notable people
 Francisco Regalón (born 19 February 1987) is a Spanish professional footballer who plays for CD Numancia

Towns in Spain
Planned communities in Spain
Populated places in the Province of Córdoba (Spain)
Province of Córdoba (Spain)
Localities of Spain